When Love Begins is a 2008 Philippine romance film directed by Jose Javier Reyes and starring Aga Muhlach and Anne Curtis. The film was released by Star Cinema and Viva Films.

Plot
Benedicto "Ben" Caballero (Aga Muhlach) is an environmentalist who disapproves of deforestation for villages in mountainous regions in the country. He is more concerned of the environment than that of getting along with his siblings. It is revealed that he was a former lawyer and that he quit because of a matter between right or wrong, and not about winning or losing. He focuses on nature - for him, it's all about saving the planet.

He visits Boracay and meets Michelle "Mitch" Valmonte (Anne Curtis) after an accident. Mitch is a carefree party girl who works for her father's company. She and Ben get to know each other and develop special interests for each other.

But making a relationship without any commitment is one problem they both have to deal with. It goes well at first, but the relationship ends because of its impossibilities.

Ben then discovers that Mitch's father owns the company that ordered the deforestation and construction of a new village in which he is against. This leads them separate ways and they try to forget about their so-called relationship.

But is this the end? Will Mitch and Ben face the trials of a relationship that will never happen?

Cast

Main cast
Aga Muhlach as Ben Caballero
Anne Curtis as Mitch Valmonte

Supporting cast

Boots Anson-Roa as Marietta Caballero
Ronaldo Valdez as Leo Caballero
Jon Avila as Wally
AJ Dee as Greg
Christopher De Leon as Paco Valmonte
Desiree Del Valle as Raisa
Gemma Fitzgerald as Lisa
Angel Jacob as Marides Caballero
Davey Langit as Mitoy
Jennifer Lee as Sandra
Alma Lerma as  Yaya Gloria
Dionne Monsanto as Nena
Mads Nicolas as Mommy Offie
Mandy Ochoa as Anton Caballero
Mickey Perz as Caleb
Dimples Romana as Carrie Caballero
Rafael Rosell as Alger
Riza Santos as Christine
Gail Nicolas as Sharmaine
Mark Manicad as Jeffrey

Reception
The Star Cinema and Viva Films' romantic drama When Love Begins has already grossed  on its first two weeks of running.

External links
 

Star Cinema films
Viva Films films
2008 films
2008 romantic drama films
Philippine romantic drama films